Latin World Entertainment Holdings Inc. (also known as LWE or LatinWE) is a talent management, production company and entertainment marketing firm, with offices in Beverly Hills and Miami. The company was founded by Luis Balaguer and Sofía Vergara in 1994. LWE is a multi-service company with a full approach including publicity, licensing, endorsements, brand integration, production and content development. It is considered to be the premier Hispanic talent management agency in the United States.

Clients

 Sofía Vergara
 Calle y Poché
 Little Vale
 Sebastián Villalobos
 Juan Jaramillo
 Xime Ponch
 Paula Galindo (Pautips)
 Andrew Ponch
 Katy Esquivel
 Juana Martinez
 Mario Ruiz
 Daniel Patiño (Paisa)
 Maria Laura Quintero
 Mario Selman
 Matthew Windey
 Priscila Gonzalez
 Issa Vásquez
 Raúl De Molina
 Nacho Figueras
 Gaby Espino
 Rafael Amaya
 Enrique Alejandro
 Cristián de la Fuente
 Myrka Dellanos
 Blanca Soto
 Karla Monroig
 Maritza Rodríguez
 Elizabeth Gutiérrez
 Ingrid Hoffmann
 Giselle Blondet
 Fernando del Rincón
 Alejandra Espinoza
 Johnny Lozada
 Rodner Figueroa
 Ana Brenda Contreras
 Pamela Silva Conde
 Maxi Iglesias
 Evaluna Montaner
 Ariadna Gutiérrez

Filmography

Television
 ¡Viva Hollywood! (with World of Wonder Productions) (2008)
 Killer Women (with Electus and ABC Studios) (2014)
 Su nombre era Dolores, la Jenn que yo conocí (with BTF Media) (2017)
 El secreto de Selena (with BTF Media) (2018)

Film
 Don't Mess with Texas (with New Line Cinema, Metro-Goldwyn-Mayer, and Pacific Standard) (2015)
 Koati (with Upstairs) (2021)

References

External links
 

Companies based in Miami
American companies established in 1994
Mass media companies established in 1994
Film production companies of the United States
Television production companies of the United States
Talent agencies